Penrith North Lakes (also shortened to Penrith) is a railway station on the West Coast Main Line, which runs between London Euston and Edinburgh Waverley or Glasgow Central. It is owned by Network Rail and managed by Avanti West Coast.

Background

The station was built by the Lancaster and Carlisle Railway, and opened on 17 December 1846. The station was designed by Sir William Tite, designer of a number of early railway stations in Britain, including neighbouring Carlisle (Citadel), as well as Carnforth and Lancaster (Castle). It is recorded in the National Heritage List for England as a designated Grade II listed building.

An 1863 Ordnance Survey plan shows refreshment facilities in the large room seen to the right on entering the building, but this is now used for storage.

Although the station is now relatively quiet, at one time it served as the terminus of the Cockermouth, Keswick and Penrith Railway and the North Eastern Railway's Eden Valley branch. The latter joined with the South Durham and Lancashire Union Railway at Kirkby Stephen, providing connections to the East Coast Main Line at Darlington. In the mid-nineteenth century, there was a plan to connect Penrith to the lead mines at Caldbeck by rail, eventually joining up with the Cumbrian Coast Line near Wigton.

Passenger services to Darlington and Kirkby Stephen were withdrawn on 22 January 1962, whilst those to  via Cockermouth fell victim to the Beeching Axe around four years later. The surviving section of the Cockermouth, Keswick and Penrith Railway as far as Keswick survived until 6 March 1972. There have recently been plans to re-open the line as far as Keswick, but there have been no further developments to progress this at present.

The station was the last in the United Kingdom where mail was collected by a moving train, the practice finally coming to an end on 3 October 1971.

Opened as Penrith, the station was renamed Penrith for Ullswater Lake in 1904. The station's name reverted to the original Penrith on 6 May 1974. It has since been renamed Penrith North Lakes on 18 May 2003.

Facilities

The station is staffed throughout the day, with the ticket office open from 05:30–19:00 Monday to Saturday and 11:30–19:00 on Sunday. A self-service ticket machine is also available. Each platform has next train audio-visual displays, with customer help points on platforms 1 and 2 (platform 3 is rarely used). Waiting rooms are provided on platforms 1 and 2, along with toilets, a post box and a payphone.  Step-free access is available to all platforms via lifts, with a footbridge and subway also available.

Services

Avanti West Coast
Following the December 2021 timetable change, Avanti West Coast operate 11 trains per day heading south towards London Euston via Birmingham New Street (nine trains per day on Saturday and six trains per day on Sunday). A single evening service operates to Crewe on weekdays, with two trains to Birmingham New Street on Saturday, and a once-daily service on Sunday. Heading north, there are 11 trains per day (nine trains per day on Saturday and eight on Sunday) towards Glasgow Central via Carlisle, as well as four trains per day (three trains per day on Saturday) towards Edinburgh Waverley via Carlisle.

Rolling stock used: Class 390 Pendolino

TransPennine Express
Following the December 2021 timetable change, TransPennine Express operate nine trains per day heading north towards Glasgow Central via Carlisle (seven trains per day on Sunday), as well as three trains per day to Edinburgh Waverley via Carlisle. Heading south, there are 15 trains per day to Manchester Airport (11 trains per day on Sunday), with a once-daily service to Liverpool Lime Street.

Rolling stock used: Class 397 Civity

See also
Listed buildings in Penrith, Cumbria

References

External links

 
 

Railway stations in Cumbria
DfT Category D stations
Former Lancaster and Carlisle Railway stations
Railway stations in Great Britain opened in 1846
Railway stations served by TransPennine Express
Railway stations served by Avanti West Coast
Penrith, Cumbria
1846 establishments in England
Grade II listed buildings in Cumbria
Stations on the West Coast Main Line